Santa Maria Nuova is an ancient Romanesque style Roman Catholic church in Viterbo in the Region of Lazio, Italy.

History 
A church at the site existed prior to 1080 when documents note that the church, along with its adjacent hospital/hostel for pilgrims, was donated to the city of Viterbo. The church, until 1574, was once the archive, bank, and assembly hall for the popular assemblies. After that, the functions were moved to the Palazzo dei Priori. It is said, that in 1266, Thomas Aquinas preached from the pulpit in this church.

The interior has six columns, each with their individual Corinthian capital. The wall niches have frescoes by Matteo Giovannetti (a 1340s Crucifixion with the Madonna, Magdalen, St John, and St James Major); Francesco d’Antonio Zacchi, also called il Balletta (Resurrected Christ); and Antonio Del Massaro, also called il Pastura, (Saints Jerome, John the Baptist, and Lawrence). The church also houses a 13th-century Triptych of San Salvatore, as well as modern works. It houses a canvas depicting the Virgin and Child with Saints Bartholemew and Lawrence, attributed to Giovan Francesco d’Avanzarano. In the presbytery is a modern bronze plaque depicting The Last supper (1964) by Carlo Canestrari. Part of the cloister adjacent to the church dates from the Lombard era.

References

External links 
 

Roman Catholic churches in Viterbo
Romanesque architecture in Lazio
Maria Nuova